Sue Charles is a Welsh TV and weather presenter for BBC Wales. Sue presents the morning and weekend weather broadcasts for Wales Today, as well as acting as a relief weather presenter for meteorologist Derek Brockway.

Born and educated in Llandrindod Wells, Powys, she took a holiday job with Radio Wyvern. She started out on the youth programme "Street Cred," and ended up producing and later as a stand-in Christmas news presenter.

Moving to BBC Radio 1, she became a music reporter, before moving to BBC Radio 2 in 1991, and then to BBC Radio Wales as a journalist.

In 1998 Charles made the move to television as a presenter on Wales Today. She joined the BBC Wales weather team in 2008, along with fellow weather presenter Behnaz Akhgar.

References

BBC Cymru Wales newsreaders and journalists
BBC weather forecasters
Welsh journalists
Welsh women journalists
Welsh television presenters
Welsh women television presenters
Living people
People from Llandrindod Wells
Year of birth missing (living people)